Loensia is a genus of common barklice in the family Psocidae. There are more than 30 described species in Loensia.

Species
These 33 species belong to the genus Loensia:

 Loensia bannaensis Li, 2002
 Loensia beijingensis Li, 2002
 Loensia bicolor (Enderlein, 1900)
 Loensia bidens Li, 2002
 Loensia bifurcata (Li, 1992)
 Loensia binalis Li, 2002
 Loensia conspersa (Banks, 1903)
 Loensia corollidenta Li, 2001
 Loensia dolabrata Li, 2002
 Loensia excrescens Li, 1997
 Loensia falcata Li, 1997
 Loensia fasciata (Fabricius, 1787)
 Loensia folivalva Li, 2002
 Loensia fuscimacula Enderlein, 1926
 Loensia glabridorsum Enderlein, 1926
 Loensia guangdongica Li, 2002
 Loensia infundibularis (Li, 1989)
 Loensia longicaudata Li, 2005
 Loensia maculosa (Banks, 1908)
 Loensia media Li, 2002
 Loensia moesta (Hagen, 1861)
 Loensia pearmani Kimmins, 1941
 Loensia pycnacantha Li, 2002
 Loensia rectangula Li, 2002
 Loensia schoenemanni Enderlein, 1926
 Loensia scrobicularis Li, 2002
 Loensia sexcornuta Li, 2001
 Loensia spicata Li, 1995
 Loensia spissa Li, 1995
 Loensia stigmatoidea (Li, 1993)
 Loensia taeniana (Li & Yang, 1987)
 Loensia teretiuscula (Li & Yang, 1987)
 Loensia variegata (Latreille, 1799)

References

External links

 

Psocidae
Articles created by Qbugbot